Boris Nikolayevich Zolotaryov (13 March 1953) was the head of administration of Evenk Autonomous Okrug (8 April 2001 – 31 December 2006).

He is a graduate of Evening Faculty of Moscow Institute of Electronic Technology in 1984.

References

External links 
 Biography on Siberian Federal District Web-site 

1953 births
Living people
People from Kurganinsky District
United Russia politicians
21st-century Russian politicians
Governors of Evenk Autonomous Okrug